Milove Raion (translit. Melovskiy raion) was a raion (district) in Luhansk Oblast of eastern Ukraine. It was located on the Russian border. The administrative center of the raion was the urban-type settlement of Milove. The raion was abolished on 18 July 2020 as part of the administrative reform of Ukraine, which reduced the number of raions of Luhansk Oblast to eight, of which only four were controlled by the government. The territory of the former raion was occupied by invading Russian forces early in the 2022 Russian invasion of Ukraine.

Demographics 
As of the 2001 Ukrainian census:

Ethnicity
 Ukrainians: 77.7%
 Russians: 19.6%
 Belarusians: 0.3%

References

Former raions of Luhansk Oblast
1920 establishments in Ukraine
Ukrainian raions abolished during the 2020 administrative reform